Ousteri Lake (French: Lac Oustéri) is a lake in the union territory of Puducherry, state of Tamil Nadu. This lake is also called as Ossudu Lake as it is located in the village named Ossudu. 

The lake extends to about 800 hectares in which 390 hectares lies in Puducherry and the rest in Tamil Nadu. It is the largest lake of Puducherry.

Bird sanctuary 
Ousteri Lake is a man-made lake, which is considered as one of the important wetlands in Asia.  Different species of migratory birds reside in this lake throughout the year, for which the lake gains significance from the IBA (Important Bird Areas). In 2008 Ousteri wetlands in Puducherry was declared as a bird sanctuary, while the wetlands in Tamil Nadu was declared in 2015.

Tourism 
The lake is one of the prominent tourist spot in Puducherry. The Puducherry Tourism Department Corporation has made a small boat club in the lake for tourists. The Puducherry government is proposing to make Ousteri as a National park. It also has proposed to set up telescopes to watch the birds and make the region as an eco tourism destination.

References 

Lakes of Puducherry